Lambert Guillaume Louis Théodore Meertens or L.G.L.T. Meertens (born 10 May 1944, in Amsterdam) is a Dutch computer scientist and professor. , he is a researcher at the Kestrel Institute, a nonprofit computer science research center in Palo Alto's Stanford Research Park.

Life and career 
As a student at the Ignatius Gymnasium in Amsterdam, Meertens designed a computer with Kees Koster, a classmate. In the 1960s, Meertens applied affix grammars to the description and composition of music, and obtained a special prize from the jury at the 1968 International Federation for Information Processing (IFIP) Congress in Edinburgh for his computer-generated string quartet, Quartet No. 1 in C major for 2 violins, viola and violoncello, based on the first non-context-free affix grammar. The string quartet was published in 1968, as Mathematical Centre Report MR 96.

Meertens was one of the editors of the Revised ALGOL 68 Report. He was the originator and one of the designers of the programming language ABC, the incidental predecessor of Python. He was chairman of the Dutch Pacifist Socialist Party (PSP) from 1975 until 1981. He was codesigner of the Bird–Meertens formalism, along with Richard Bird, who also gifted him the Meertens number.

He became involved with developing international standards in programming and informatics, as a member of IFIP Working Group 2.1 on Algorithmic Languages and Calculi, which specified, maintains, and supports the languages ALGOL 60 and ALGOL 68. From 1999 to 2009, he was chairperson.

His original work was at the Mathematical Centre (MC), now called Centrum Wiskunde & Informatica (CWI), in Amsterdam, the Netherlands. After having been Associate Professor of Computer Science at New York University in 1982–83, he was part-time Professor of Applied Logic at Delft University of Technology, the Netherlands, from 1984 to 1986 before becoming part-time Professor of Software Technology at Utrecht University, the Netherlands, where he is now professor emeritus. , he works as a researcher at the Kestrel Institute in Palo Alto, California.

Awards 
 2007: International Federation for Information Processing (IFIP) Silver Core
 2015: IFIP Outstanding Service Award

References

External links
 , Kestrel Institute
 , Utrecht University
 List of Publications

1944 births
Living people
Dutch computer scientists
Pacifist Socialist Party politicians
Party chairs of the Netherlands
Scientists from Amsterdam
University of Amsterdam alumni
Academic staff of Utrecht University